Juneau Park, located in Milwaukee, Wisconsin, is situated on a bluff overlooking Lake Michigan. It is popular for its short distance to downtown Milwaukee, lakefront walking path, and vantage point for fireworks displays.

Early history

Located within the park is a tribute to the city's first mayor, Solomon Juneau. The Juneau Monument, designed by Richard Park, was built in 1887. Also within the park is the 1887 statue, Leif, the Discoverer of Leif Erikson made by sculptor Anne Whitney. It is a replica of a statue in Boston.

Gertie the Duck
Gertie the Duck, an icon of Milwaukee history, was moved with her ducklings to the lagoon at Juneau Park in the mid-1940s for their safety. The story of a duck, Gertie, and her efforts to watch over nine eggs— and ultimately hatch six ducklings on a wood piling below the Wisconsin Avenue Bridge—was reported by Gordon MacQuarrie of the Milwaukee Journal and  became an inspiration for many war-weary Americans near the end of World War II. Passers-by, the Boy Scouts, and a Wisconsin Humane Society officer watched over Gertie and her growing family. Besides local newspapers, the story was picked up in national and U.K. press. After surviving bad weather and a nearby fire, the ducks were relocated to the Juneau Park lagoon.

References

Further reading

External links
 Juneau Park Friends
 Map of Juneau Park

Geography of Milwaukee
Tourist attractions in Milwaukee
Parks in Wisconsin